1st Idelbaevo (1-se İźelbay) is a rural locality (a village) in Taymeyevskoye Rural Settlement of Salavatsky District, Bashkortostan, Russia. The population was 108 as of 2010.

Geography 
1st Idelbaevo is located 45 km northwest of Maloyaz (the district's administrative centre) by road. 2nd Idelbayevo is the nearest rural locality.

Ethnicity 
The village is inhabited by Bashkirs.

Streets 
 Naberezhnaya
 Tsentralnaya
 Shkolnaya

Famous people 
 Mazgar Abdullin - Bashkir writer and journalist was born in this village.

References

External links 
 1st Idelbaevo on travellers.ru

Rural localities in Salavatsky District